This is a list of films set on trains.

List

 
Train
Films